Lone Dybkjær (23 May 1940 – 20 July 2020) was a Danish politician. She served three non-consecutive terms as a member of the Folketing.

Between 1988 to 1990, she was Minister for the Environment of Denmark during the second Poul Schlüter cabinet. Between 1994 to 2004, she was a member of the European Parliament.

Political career
She was a member of the Radikale Venstre, a Danish party in the middle of the political spectrum. She was a member of the European Parliament for the party from 1994-2004 and also a member of the Danish Parliament (Folketinget), where she served as minister of Environment during the Cabinet of Poul Schlüter.

She was a member of the eminent international Council of Patrons of the Asian University for Women (AUW) in Chittagong, Bangladesh. The University, which is the product of east-west foundational partnerships (Bill and Melinda Gates Foundation, Open Society Foundation, IKEA Foundation, etc) and regional cooperation, serves extraordinarily talented women from 15 countries across Asia and the Middle East.

Personal life
She graduated from Rungsted Statsskole in 1958 and took a Master of Engineering in chemistry at the Technical University of Denmark in 1964.

In 1994, she married then-Prime Minister Poul Nyrup Rasmussen.

Dybkjær died on 20 July 2020 in Copenhagen from cancer, aged 80.

References

External links
 

1940 births
2020 deaths
20th-century women MEPs for Denmark
21st-century women MEPs for Denmark
Danish Ministers for the Environment
Danish Social Liberal Party MEPs
Danish Social Liberal Party politicians
Deaths from cancer in Denmark
MEPs for Denmark 1994–1999
MEPs for Denmark 1999–2004
Members of the Folketing 1973–1975
Members of the Folketing 1975–1977
Members of the Folketing 1979–1981
Members of the Folketing 1981–1984
Members of the Folketing 1984–1987
Members of the Folketing 1987–1988
Members of the Folketing 1988–1990
Members of the Folketing 1990–1994
Members of the Folketing 2005–2007
Members of the Folketing 2007–2011
Politicians from Copenhagen
Women government ministers of Denmark
Women members of the Folketing
20th-century Danish engineers
Women chemical engineers